Hiattville is an unincorporated community in Bourbon County, Kansas, United States.

History
A post office at Hiattville was established in 1870. It was first called Pawnee, but later renamed Hiattville in honor of James M. Hiatt, who owned the town site. The Sedalia branch Missouri-Kansas-Texas Railroad passed through Hiattville from the 1870s until the line was abandoned in 1988.

Education
The community is served by Uniontown USD 235 public school district.

References

Further reading

External links
 Bourbon County maps: Current, Historic - KDOT

Unincorporated communities in Bourbon County, Kansas
Unincorporated communities in Kansas